Gordon Douglas Slade  (born December 14, 1955 in Toronto) is a Canadian mathematician, specializing in probability theory.

Education 
Slade received in 1977 his bachelor's degree from the University of Toronto and in 1984 his PhD for research supervised by Joel Feldman and Lon Rosen at the University of British Columbia.

Career and Research 
As a postdoc he was a lecturer at the University of Virginia. From 1986 he was at McMaster University and since 1999 he is a professor at the University of British Columbia.

He developed the technique of lace expansion (originally introduced by David Brydges and Thomas C. Spencer in 1985) with applications to probability theory and statistical mechanics, such as self-avoiding random walks and their enumeration, random graphs, percolation theory, and branched polymers.

In 1989 Slade proved with Takashi Hara that the Aizenman–Newman triangle condition at critical percolation is valid in sufficiently high dimension. The Hara–Slade result has important consequences in mean field theory.

In 1991 Slade and Hara used the lace expansion to prove that the average distance covered in self-avoiding random walks in 5 or more dimension grows as the square root of the number of steps and that the scaling limit is Brownian motion.

Honours and awards

Slade was an invited speaker in 1994 at the ICM in Zürich with lecture The critical behaviour of random systems.

Slade received in 1995 the Coxeter–James Prize and in the 2010 the CRM-Fields-PIMS Prize. He was elected a Fellow of the Royal Society of Canada (FRSC) in 2000, in 2010 of the Fields Institute, and in 2012 of the American Mathematical Society and of the Institute of Mathematical Statistics. He was elected a Fellow of the Royal Society in 2017.  In 2018 Slade was awarded the Jeffery–Williams Prize.

Selected publications 
with Neal Madras: Self-avoiding walk, Birkhäuser 1993
The lace expansion and its applications (École d’Eté de Probabilités de Saint-Flour XXXIV, 2004), Springer Verlag 2006

References

1955 births
Living people
University of Toronto alumni
University of British Columbia alumni
Academic staff of the University of British Columbia
Canadian mathematicians
Fellows of the Royal Society of Canada
Fellows of the American Mathematical Society
Fellows of the Institute of Mathematical Statistics
Probability theorists
Canadian Fellows of the Royal Society